Yaralujeh (also Romanized as Yārālūjeh; also known as Yaraldzha and Yārālūcheh) is a village in Peyghan Chayi Rural District, in the Central District of Kaleybar County, East Azerbaijan Province, Iran. At the 2006 census, its population was 10, in 4 families.

References 

Populated places in Kaleybar County